The Very Best of the Strawbs: Halcyon Days is a compilation album by English band Strawbs. Although credited to Strawbs it does contain three Hudson Ford tracks and a Dave Cousins solo track (taken from his album Two Weeks Last Summer). The album was released as a 2-CD set in the UK and US. The US release has a slightly different title (The Very Best of Strawbs: Halcyon Days – The A & M Years) and a different track listing.

Cover 

The cover image is of a common kingfisher, a reference to the mythical kingsfisher of Halcyon days.

Track listing – UK release

CD one

"Ghosts" (Dave Cousins) – 8:30
"Sweet Dreams"
"Night Light"
"Guardian Angel"
"Night Light"
"On Growing Older" (Cousins) – 1:56
"The Man Who Called Himself Jesus" (Cousins) – 3:50
"Stormy Down" (Cousins) – 2:44
"I Turned My Face into the Wind" (Cousins) – 2:35
"Queen of Dreams" (Cousins) – 5:31
"Witchwood" (Cousins) – 3:22
"Keep the Devil Outside" (John Ford) – 3:01
"The Hangman and the Papist" (Cousins) – 4:11
"Benedictus" (Cousins) – 3:38
"Golden Salamander" (Cousins) – 4:54
"Tokyo Rosie" (Cousins) – 2:49
"Hero and Heroine" (Cousins) – 3:22
"Pick up the Pieces" (Richard Hudson, Ford) – 2:35 Hudson Ford track
"Lay Down" (Cousins) – 4:32
"Backside" (Cousins) – 3:50
"Out in the Cold" (Cousins) – 3:19
"Round and Round" (Cousins) – 4:44
"Oh How She Changed" (Cousins, Tony Hooper) – 2:52

In the liner notes, track 16 is referred to as "Ciggy Barlust (Backside)"

CD two

"The Battle" (Cousins) – 6:25
"Grace Darling" (Cousins) – 3:54
"Blue Angel" (Cousins) – 9:46 Dave Cousins solo track
"Divided"
"Half Worlds Apart"
"At Rest"
"Here It Comes" (Cousins) – 2:42
"The Shepherd's Song" (Cousins) – 4:33
"We'll Meet Again Sometime" (Cousins) – 3:12
"Martin Luther King's Dream" [Live] (Cousins) – 2:53
"Burn Baby Burn" (Hudson, Ford) – 3:02 Hudson Ford track
"Shine on Silver Sun" (Cousins) – 2:46
"Why and Wherefore" (Cousins, Dave Lambert, Chas Cronk, John Hawken, Rod Coombes) – 5:31
"Floating in the Wind" (Hudson, Ford) – 4:13 Hudson Ford track
"Absent Friend" (Cousins) – 4:35
"Part of the Union" (Hudson, Ford) – 2:56
"Will Ye Go" (Francis McPeake) – 3:54
"The River" (Cousins) – 2:23
"Down by the Sea" (Cousins) – 6:19
"Tell Me What You See in Me" (Cousins) – 6:11

Track listing – US release

CD one

"The Man Who Called Himself Jesus" (Cousins) – 3:50
"Where Is This Dream of Your Youth" (Cousins)
"The Battle" (Cousins) – 6:25
"The Weary Song" (Cousins) – 3:50
"I Turned My Face into the Wind" (Cousins) – 2:35
"Forever" (Cousins, Hooper) – 3:32
"Song of a Sad Little Girl" (Cousins) – 5:28
"A Glimpse of Heaven" (Cousins) – 3:50
"Witchwood" (Cousins) – 3:22
"Sheep" (Cousins) – 4:14
"The Shepherd's Song" (Cousins) – 4:33
"The Hangman and the Papist" (Cousins) – 4:11
"Benedictus" (Cousins) – 3:38
"Queen of Dreams" (Cousins) – 5:31
"Heavy Disguise" (Ford) – 2:53
"New World" (Cousins) – 4:11
"Two Weeks Last Summer" (Cousins) – 3:07 Dave Cousins solo track
"Blue Angel" (Cousins) – 9:46 Dave Cousins solo track
"Divided"
"Half Worlds Apart"
"At Rest"

CD two

"Here It Comes" (Cousins) – 2:42
"Part of the Union" (Hudson, Ford) – 2:56
"Tears and Pavan" – 6:35
"Tears" (Cousins)
"Pavan" (Cousins, Hudson, Ford)
"The River" (Cousins) – 2:23
"Down by the Sea" (Cousins) – 6:19
"Lay Down" (Cousins) – 4:32
"Autumn" – 8:27
"Heroine's Theme" (Hawken)
"Deep Summer Sleep" (Cousins)
"The Winter Long" (Cousins)
"Hero and Heroine" (Cousins) – 3:22
"Midnight Sun" (Cronk, Cousins) – 3:06
"Out in the Cold" (Cousins) – 3:19
"Round and Round" (Cousins) – 4:44
"Ghosts" (Cousins) – 8:30
"Sweet Dreams"
"Night Light"
"Guardian Angel"
"Night Light"
"Grace Darling" (Cousins) – 3:54
"Lemon Pie" (Cousins) – 4:03
"To Be Free" (Cousins) – 4:17
"Hanging in the Gallery" (Cousins) – 4:32
"The Promised Land" (Cronk) – 4:07

Personnel

The songs were performed by several incarnations of Strawbs, plus the Hudson Ford and Dave Cousins session musicians. The following musicians featured: –

Dave Cousins – vocals, acoustic guitar, dulcimer
Tony Hooper – vocals, acoustic guitar
Dave Lambert – vocals, electric guitar
Miller Anderson – electric guitar (on Dave Cousins solo tracks)
Micky Keen – guitar (on Hudson Ford tracks)
Claire Deniz – cello
Rick Wakeman – keyboards
Blue Weaver – keyboards
John Hawken – keyboards
Andy Richards – keyboards
Chris Parren – keyboards (on Hudson Ford tracks)
Ron Chesterman – double bass
John Ford – vocals, bass guitar
Chas Cronk – bass guitar, vocals
Rod Demick – bass guitar, vocals
Roger Glover – bass guitar (on Dave Cousins solo tracks)
Richard Hudson – drums, guitar, vocals
Rod Coombes – drums, vocals
Tony Fernandez – drums
Ken Laws – drums (on Hudson Ford tracks)
Jon Hiseman – drums (on Dave Cousins solo tracks)

Release history

References
Halcyon Days (UK release) on Strawbsweb
Halcyon Days (US release) on Strawbsweb
Liner notes to CD set 540,662-2

1997 compilation albums
Strawbs compilation albums
A&M Records compilation albums